Munchin' is an album by American jazz trumpeter Wallace Roney which was recorded in 1993 and released on the Muse label.

Reception

The AllMusic review by Ken Dryden stated, "Wallace Roney is clearly shaking the comparisons to Miles Davis, even while covering some of the same ground as the late jazz legend. ... This is easily one of Wallace Roney's best".

Track listing
 "Solar" (Miles Davis) − 8:56
 "Ah-Leu-Cha" (Charlie Parker) − 6:11
 "Bemsha Swing" (Thelonious Monk, Denzil Best) − 7:38
 "Lost" (Wayne Shorter) − 6:09
 "Daahoud" (Clifford Brown) − 6:05
 "Whims of Chambers" (Paul Chambers) − 7:22
 "Smooch" (Davis, Charles Mingus) − 8:02
 "Love for Sale" (Cole Porter) − 7:35

Personnel 
Wallace Roney − trumpet
Ravi Coltrane − tenor saxophone (tracks 1-3, 5 & 8)
Geri Allen − piano 
Christian McBride − bass
Kenny Washington − drums

References 

1993 albums
Wallace Roney albums
Albums recorded at Van Gelder Studio
Muse Records albums